Juan Fernando Fernández Méndez (born June 20, 1989 in Salamanca, Guanajuato) is a Mexican professional footballer who plays for Celaya on loan from Cruz Azul of Liga MX.

External links

References

1989 births
Living people
People from Salamanca, Guanajuato
Mexican footballers
Club Celaya footballers
C.D. Veracruz footballers
Liga MX players
Association footballers not categorized by position